The Childs River, also known as Child's River, is a  river near Falmouth, Massachusetts on Cape Cod. It has been heavily impacted by the development of cranberry bogs in its upper reaches.

The river arises from John's Pond in Mashpee, just north of today's Route 28, and empties into Waquoit Bay. It runs parallel to the Quashnet River.

References 

 Environmental Protection Agency
 Waquoit Bay National Estuarine Research Reserve
 Trout Unlimited

Rivers of Barnstable County, Massachusetts
Rivers of Massachusetts